The Bushmaster III is a 35 mm automatic/semi-automatic cannon designed and built by Alliant Techsystems, based on the 25 mm M242 Bushmaster. The weapon has been selected as primary armament for the CV9035 export versions of the CV90 infantry fighting vehicles (IFV) currently in service with the Danish, Dutch and Estonian armies. The Bushmaster III is a chain gun, like the other members of the Bushmaster family, which grants it great dependability and safety from ammunition cook-off even though it does result in lower rates of fire.

50 mm version 
The U.S. Army is testing the Bushmaster 50 mm cannon as a counter rocket, artillery, and mortar (C-RAM) and counter unmanned aerial vehicle (C-UAV) weapon. Initially developed under the Extended Area Protection and Survivability Integrated Demonstration (EAPS ID), it has been successfully tested in tracking distant moving targets using interferometric radar as a sensor, fire control computer, and radio frequency transmitter and receiver to launch a course-correcting projectile. The command guided interceptors have a thruster that receives commands for maneuvering and warhead detonation, with a tantalum-tungsten alloy liner to form forward propelled penetrators to defeat C-RAM targets, and steel body fragments to destroy UAVs.

The caliber is the NATO standard 35x228 introduced by the Oerlikon KD in the 1950s. Bushmaster III can be converted to a caliber of 50×228 mm, which involves changing the barrel and a few key parts, to use the SuperShot 50 cartridge.

Specifications 
Recoil: 14,000 lb/6300 kg
Weight:
Receiver: 150 lb/68 kg
Feeder: 80 lb/36 kg
Barrel: 250 lb/113 kg1
Total: 480 lb/218 kg
Rate of Fire: Semi-automatic or 200 rpm
Power Required:  at 24 volts
Clearing Method: Open Bolt, semi-closed bolt
Safety: Absolute hangfire protection
Case Ejection: Forward

1 Includes gun barrel, drive motor, recoil system and integral dual feeder.

See also
 M230 30 mm automatic cannon
 Bushmaster II 30 mm chain gun
 Bushmaster IV 40 mm chain gun
 Oerlikon GDF
 Bofors 40 mm gun

References

External links
 Alliant Techsystems (ATK) Bushmaster III Automatic Cannon Fact Sheet
 http://www.deagel.com/pandora/m242-bushmaster-iii_de00142003.aspx

Autocannon
Vehicle weapons
Alliant Techsystems
35 mm artillery
Military equipment introduced in the 1990s